The Roman Catholic Diocese of Jequié is a diocese located in the city of Jequié in the Ecclesiastical province of Vitória da Conquista in Brazil.

History
 7 November 1978: Established as Diocese of Jequié from the Diocese of Amargosa and Diocese of Vitória da Conquista

Bishops
 Bishops of Jequié (Roman rite)
Cristiano Jakob Krapf (1978.11.07 – 2012.07.04)
Ruy Gonçalves Lopes, O.F.M. Cap. (2012.07.04 - 2010.07.10), appointed Bishop of Caruaru, Pernambuco

Other priests of this diocese who became bishops
Antônio Tourinho Neto, appointed Auxiliary Bishop of Olinda e Recife, Pernambuco in 2014
Vítor Agnaldo de Menezes, appointed Bishop of Propriá, Sergipe in 2017

References

 GCatholic.org
 Catholic Hierarchy
 Diocese website (Portuguese) 

Roman Catholic dioceses in Brazil
Christian organizations established in 1978
Jequie, Roman Catholic Diocese of
Roman Catholic dioceses and prelatures established in the 20th century